The 1972 Astro-Bluebonnet Bowl, part of the 1972 bowl game season, took place on December 30, 1972, at the Houston Astrodome in Houston, Texas. The competing teams were the LSU Tigers and Tennessee Volunteers with each team being a member of the Southeastern Conference, although the teams did not meet in the regular season. Tennessee won the game 24–17.

Teams

LSU

The 1972 LSU Tigers finished the regular season with a 9–1–1 record with its lone loss coming against Alabama and a tie against Florida. The appearance marked the second for LSU in the Astro-Bluebonnet Bowl, and their eighteenth overall bowl game.

Tennessee

The 1972 Tennessee Volunteers finished the regular season with a 9–2 record with a loss to both Alabama and Auburn. The appearance marked the second for Tennessee in the Astro-Bluebonnet Bowl, and their nineteenth overall bowl game.

Game summary

Scoring summary

Source:

Statistics

References

Astro-Bluebonnet Bowl
Bluebonnet Bowl
LSU Tigers football bowl games
Tennessee Volunteers football bowl games
Astro-Bluebonnet Bowl
Astro-Bluebonnet Bowl